The Turtmann Glacier is a 5 km long glacier (2005) situated in the Pennine Alps in the canton of Valais in Switzerland. In 1973 it had an area of 5.91 km2. The glacier is located north of Bishorn and Weisshorn.

On an altitude of 3256m, at the western border of the glacier, lies the Tracuit Hut (French: Cabane de Tracuit). This hut, run by the Swiss Alpine Club (SAC), is a starting point for the ascent to the Bishorn, the Weisshorn and Les Diablons.

See also
List of glaciers in Switzerland
Swiss Alps

External links
Swiss glacier monitoring network

Glaciers of the Alps
Glaciers of Valais